Alice Pearce (October 16, 1917 – March 3, 1966) was an American actress. She was brought to Hollywood by Gene Kelly to reprise her Broadway performance in the film version of On the Town (1949). Pearce played comedic supporting roles in several films, before being cast as nosy neighbor Gladys Kravitz in the television sitcom Bewitched in 1964. She won the Primetime Emmy Award for Outstanding Supporting Actress in a Comedy Series posthumously after the second season of the series. She died from ovarian cancer in 1966.

Early life and career
Pearce was born in New York City, the only child of Margaret Clark and Robert E. Pearce. Her father was a foreign banking specialist, and her family moved to Europe when she was 18 months old. They lived in Brussels, Antwerp, Rome, and Paris. At age nine, she fell off a swing after losing her grip and landed on her chin. This left her with an undeveloped chin. She returned to the United States as a teenager, and boarded at the Masters School in Dobbs Ferry, New York. She graduated from Sarah Lawrence College in 1940, with a degree in drama.

She began working in nightclubs as a comedian and was cast in the original Broadway production of On the Town (1944–1946). Gene Kelly was so impressed by her that she became the only cast member to be included in the film version in 1949. Her comedic performance was well received by critics and public alike, and she was given her own television variety show, The Alice Pearce Show. More movie roles followed, and she made appearances on Broadway, where she met her husband, director Paul Davis, during a production of Bells Are Ringing.

During the 1953–1954 television season, Pearce was seen regularly on ABC's Jamie, which starred Brandon deWilde. In 1964, Pearce was originally approached to play the part of Grandmama in the ABC television comedy series The Addams Family. She turned down the part, which went to veteran actress Blossom Rock. In 1964, Pearce joined the cast of Bewitched as the nagging and nosy neighbor Gladys Kravitz. Pearce's scenes were almost entirely reactions to the witchcraft she had witnessed at the house across the street. Her hysterical accusations against Samantha, played by Elizabeth Montgomery, and the disbelief of her husband Abner (George Tobias), provided a common thread through many of the series' early episodes. She played the role until her death in 1966, and was replaced by Sandra Gould. Pearce was posthumously awarded an Emmy Award for this role. Her husband accepted the award on her behalf.

Personal life
Pearce was married twice. Her 1948 marriage to composer John Rox lasted until his death in 1957. In 1964, she married stage manager Paul Davis, with whom she remained until her death. Pearce had no children.

Death
Pearce was diagnosed with terminal cancer before Bewitched began. She kept her illness a secret, although her rapid weight loss was quite evident during the second season of the sitcom. She died from ovarian cancer toward the end of the second year of Bewitched at the age of 48. The last episode Pearce appeared in was titled "Prodigy."  It was completed many months before Pearce died, but it aired after her death as the last episode of Season #2. Pearce was cremated and her ashes were scattered at sea.

Filmography

Awards

References

External links

 
 
 

1917 births
1966 deaths
20th-century American actresses
20th-century American singers
Actresses from New York City
American film actresses
American stage actresses
American television actresses
Deaths from cancer in California
Deaths from ovarian cancer
Outstanding Performance by a Supporting Actress in a Comedy Series Primetime Emmy Award winners
People from Dobbs Ferry, New York
Sarah Lawrence College alumni
Singers from New York City
20th-century American women singers